Seguenzia floridana is a species of extremely small deep water sea snail, a marine gastropod mollusk in the family Seguenziidae.

Description
The height of the shell attains 5 mm.

Distribution

This species occurs in the Atlantic Ocean off Georgia and Florida.

References

External links
 To Biodiversity Heritage Library (3 publications)
 To Encyclopedia of Life
 To USNM Invertebrate Zoology Mollusca Collection
 To ITIS
 To World Register of Marine Species
 

floridana
Gastropods described in 1927